Xiakou is a town under the administration of Nan'an District, Chongqing, China. , it has one residential community and 6 villages under its administration.

References 

Nan'an District
Township-level divisions of Chongqing